Quadrula rumphiana, the ridged mapleleaf, is a species of freshwater mussel, an aquatic bivalve mollusk in the family Unionidae, the river mussels.

This species is endemic to the United States.

References

rumphiana
Endemic fauna of the United States
Bivalves described in 1852
Taxonomy articles created by Polbot